George Louis "Kewpie" Pennington (September 24, 1896 – May 3, 1953) was a Major League Baseball pitcher who played in one game for the St. Louis Browns on April 14, .

External links
Baseball Reference.com

1896 births
1953 deaths
St. Louis Browns players
Major League Baseball pitchers
Baseball players from New York (state)
Lawrence Barristers players
Haverhill Hustlers players
Fitchburg Burghers players
Newark Bears (IL) players
Mobile Bears players
Portland Beavers players
Hartford Senators players
Springfield Ponies players